Jill Ovens is a New Zealand trade unionist and former political candidate. She was co-leader of the Alliance party before changing her allegiance to the Labour Party.

Union leader
She previously had a long history involved in New Zealand Unions, having served as the president of the Association of Staff in Tertiary Education and was heavily involved in the Council of Trade Unions (CTU) Women's Council Convenor and attended the ICFTU World Women's Conference as one of two CTU delegates.

Alliance Party
Ovens was an Alliance candidate in Auckland's Mount Albert electorate in the 1999 and the 2002 elections, both times contesting the seat against Labour leader Helen Clark. On the party list, she was ranked 28th and 12th, respectively. Ovens became president of the Alliance party in 2004. She had previously been critical of the party's leader, Matt McCarten, for his close associations with the Māori Party. For the 2005 election she unsuccessfully contested the Manukau East electorate and was ranked first on the party list, having been elected a co-leader with Paul Piesse.

Labour Party
In 2006 she resigned as co-leader and left the Alliance party. After being elected the northern secretary of the Service & Food Workers Union in succession to Darien Fenton, she decided to join the Labour Party as it is affiliated with the Union. She is currently an Auckland/Northland regional representative on the Labour Party's Council.

Current activities

Since her election to the SFWU Ovens has been occasionally blogging on left wing social media websites and supporting union activities primarily based in Auckland. In December 2014 Ovens helped lead a walkout of food service workers at Auckland City Hospital.

References

Alliance (New Zealand political party) politicians
NewLabour Party (New Zealand) politicians
New Zealand left-wing activists
Leaders of political parties in New Zealand
Living people
Year of birth missing (living people)
New Zealand Labour Party politicians
Unsuccessful candidates in the 1999 New Zealand general election
Unsuccessful candidates in the 2002 New Zealand general election
Unsuccessful candidates in the 2005 New Zealand general election
21st-century New Zealand politicians
21st-century New Zealand women politicians